Seiko Super Tennis was the 1984 name of a men's professional tennis tournament played in Maui or Honolulu, Hawaii from 1974 through 1984 that was part of the Grand Prix circuit .  It was played on outdoor hard courts in Maui every year except 1984, when it was played on indoor carpet courts at the Blaisdell Arena in Honolulu.

Results

Singles

Doubles

References

External links
 ATP results archive

 
Grand Prix tennis circuit
Defunct tennis tournaments in the United States
Hard court tennis tournaments
1974 establishments in Hawaii
1984 disestablishments in Hawaii
Recurring sporting events established in 1974
Recurring sporting events disestablished in 1984